Inírida may refer to:

Inírida, Guainía, the capital city and a municipality of the Guainía Department in Colombia
Inírida River, a major tributary of the Guaviare River in the Guainía Department in Colombia
Inírida flower, an endemic plant in Colombia, scientific names Schoenocephalium teretifolium and Guacamaya superba